The National Weather Center (NWC), on the campus of the University of Oklahoma, is a confederation of federal, state, and academic organizations that work together to better understand events that take place in Earth's atmosphere over a wide range of time and space scales. The NWC partners give equal attention to applying that understanding to the development of improved observation, analysis, assimilation, display, and prediction systems. The National Weather Center also has expertise in local and regional climate, numerical modeling, hydrology, and weather radar. Members of the NWC work with a wide range of federal, state, and local government agencies to help reduce loss of life and property to hazardous weather, ensure wise use of water resources, and enhance agricultural production. They also work with private sector partners to develop new applications of weather and regional climate information that provide competitive advantage in the marketplace.

National Weather Center Partners
The National Weather Center building houses many organizations from the National Oceanic and Atmospheric Administration and the University of Oklahoma and several other organizations outside the NOAA or OU.

 National Oceanic and Atmospheric Administration (NOAA)
 Office of Oceanic and Atmospheric Research (OAR)
 National Severe Storms Laboratory (NSSL)
 National Weather Service (NWS)
 Norman Weather Forecast Office (OUN WFO)
 Storm Prediction Center (SPC)
 Radar Operations Center (ROC)
 Warning Decision Training Division (WDTD)
 National Centers for Environmental Prediction (NCEP)
 Storm Prediction Center (SPC)

 University of Oklahoma (OU)
 College of Atmospheric & Geographic Sciences (A&GS)
 School of Meteorology (SoM)
 Advanced Radar Research Center (ARRC)
 Center for Analysis and Prediction of Storms (CAPS)
 Cooperative Institute for Mesoscale Meteorological Studies (CIMMS)
 Department of Geography and Environmental Sustainability (GEOG)
 Environmental Verification and Analysis Center/Oklahoma Wind Power Initiative (EVAC/OWPI)
 College of Engineering (CoE)
 School of Computer Science (CS)
 School of Electrical and Computer Engineering (ECE)

 Information Technology
 Integrated Robust Assured Data Services (IRADS)

State of Oklahoma
 Oklahoma Climatological Survey (OCS)
 Oklahoma Mesonet
 Oklahoma Water Survey (OKWS)

 Other (public and private)
 Office of Weather Programs and Projects (OWPP)
 Oklahoma NASA Space Grant Consortium (OSGC)
 Sasaki Applied Meteorology Research Institute
 South Central Climate Science Center (SCCSC)
 United States Department of the Interior Climate Science Centers (South Central Region)

2015 security incident
On the afternoon of April 23, 2015, a car rammed through the gates that protect the loading dock on the building's east side. It drove toward the building before it burst into flames approximately halfway between the gates and the building. Firefighters and a bomb squad were called to the scene. Responders extinguished the fire with no damage done to the building.  Despite a rescue attempt, the driver, Allen Rouse, was found dead on the scene. Rouse, suffering from schizophrenia and paranoia, had killed himself.

References

External links
 National Weather Center
 Advanced Radar Research Center
 Center for Spatial Analysis
 OU College of Atmospheric & Geographic Sciences
 OU School of Meteorology
 Oklahoma Weather Lab (OWL) Weather Products
Oklahoma Weather Lab (OWL) Forecast Products
 OU Department of Geography
 Oklahoma Mesonet
 Environmental Verification and Analysis Center
 Natural Hazards and Disaster Research
 Integrated Radar Data Services
 Oklahoma City/Norman National Weather Service Weather Forecast Office
 Oklahoma Climatological Survey
 OU Supercomputing Center for Education & Research
 Radar Operations Center
 Warning Decision Training Branch
 Sasaki Institute

Meteorological research institutes
University of Oklahoma
Buildings and structures in Norman, Oklahoma